Henry of France may refer to:

Henry I of France (1008–1060), King of France, reigned 1027–1060
Henry II of France (1519–1559), King of France, reigned 1547–1559
Henry III of France (1551–1589), King of France, reigned 1573–1575
Henry IV of France (1553–1610), King of France, reigned 1589–1610
Henry V of France (1820–1883), pretender, 19th century
Henry of France (born 1083 and died young), second son of Philip I of France
Henry of France, Archbishop of Reims (1121–1175), Bishop of Beauvais then Archbishop of Reims, son of Louis VI of France

See also
 Henri de France, French television inventor